The Little Sugar River is a  river in western New Hampshire in the United States. It is a tributary of the Connecticut River, which flows to Long Island Sound.

The Little Sugar River begins on a tableland in the town of Unity, then drops to the west, cutting a small gorge past the north end of Perry Mountain, and enters the town of Charlestown. The river reaches the Connecticut just west of the village of North Charlestown.

See also

List of rivers of New Hampshire

References

Rivers of New Hampshire
Tributaries of the Connecticut River
Rivers of Sullivan County, New Hampshire